Galissus is a genus of beetles in the family Cerambycidae, containing the following species:

 Galissus azureus Monné & Martins, 1981
 Galissus cyanopterus Dupont, 1840
 Galissus rubriventris Martins & Galileo, 2010

References

Trachyderini
Cerambycidae genera